Jean-Yves Girard (born 1947) is a French logician working in proof theory. He is the research director (emeritus) at the mathematical institute of the University of Aix-Marseille, at Luminy.

Biography 

Jean-Yves Girard is an alumnus of the École normale supérieure de Saint-Cloud.

He made a name for himself in the 1970s with his proof of strong normalization in a system of second-order logic called System F. This result gave a new proof of Takeuti's conjecture, which was proven a few years earlier by William W. Tait, Motō Takahashi and Dag Prawitz. For this purpose, he introduced the notion of "reducibility candidate" ("candidat de réducibilité"). He is also credited with the discovery of Girard's paradox, linear logic, the geometry of interaction, ludics, and (satirically) the mustard watch.

He obtained the CNRS Silver Medal in 1983 and is a member of the French Academy of Sciences.

Bibliography 

 
 
 
 Jean-Yves Girard (2011). The Blind Spot: Lectures on Logic

See also
Affine logic

References

External links

Journées Jean-Yves Girard web site of 2007 conference in honour of Girard's 60th birthday

Living people
Proof theorists
French mathematicians
French logicians
ENS Fontenay-Saint-Cloud-Lyon alumni
Members of the French Academy of Sciences
1947 births
French National Centre for Scientific Research scientists
French philosophers
French male non-fiction writers